Eusébio Armando Gomes Bancessi (born 4 August 1995) is a Bissau-Guinean footballer who plays as a winger. He is currently a free agent.

Career
Bancessi was part of the youth system at Portuguese club Benfica before moving to England in July 2013 to join the academy of Wolverhampton Wanderers. After scoring regularly in the Under-21 Premier League he was selected in several matchday squads at first team level as Wolves won the League One title, but he remained only an unused substitute on those occasions. During the close season he signed a new contract with Wolves that runs until summer 2017 (with the option of a further year).

In October 2014 he was loaned to League Two side Cheltenham Town for a month, for whom he made his professional debut on 11 October 2014 against  Shrewsbury, in the first of four appearances for the club.

Bancessi joined Telford United on a one-month loan he made his debut against Gainsborough Trinity wearing the number 7 shirt.

On 12 August 2019 Swiss club FC Rapperswil-Jona announced the signing of Bancessi. Following 40 league appearances for the club, Bancessi was released in February 2022.

Honours
Wolverhampton Wanderers
Football League One: 2013–14

References

External links

1995 births
Living people
Sportspeople from Bissau
Bissau-Guinean footballers
Portuguese footballers
Bissau-Guinean expatriate footballers
Association football midfielders
Wolverhampton Wanderers F.C. players
Cheltenham Town F.C. players
Olimpia Grudziądz players
MKP Pogoń Siedlce players
FC Rapperswil-Jona players
English Football League players
I liga players
Swiss Promotion League players
Expatriate footballers in England
Expatriate footballers in Poland
Expatriate footballers in Switzerland